Carmen Gaina is the Director of the Centre for Earth Evolution and Dynamics (CEED) a Norwegian Centre of Excellence hosted at the Department of Geosciences, University of Oslo, Norway.

Carmen is a geophysicist whose research includes deciphering Earth's crustal and mantle structure and evolution. Her expertise lies in combining geological and geophysical data of the oceans and continental margins. Her research also investigates the interaction of the solid Earth, oceans and atmosphere for the geological past by modelling paleo-bathymetry, sea-level and global geochemical budgets resulting from plate tectonics.

Projects
She led projects involving compilations of large geophysical datasets including the Circum-Arctic Mapping Project part (CAMP-GM) of the new World Digital Magnetic Anomaly Map release (WDMAM). Previously Carmen was the team leader of the Centre for Geodynamics, Norwegian Geological Survey in Trondheim, Norway.

The Centre for Earth Evolution
The Centre for Earth Evolution and Dynamics is dedicated to research of fundamental importance to the understanding of our planet, that embraces the dynamics of the plates, the origin of large-scale volcanism, the evolution of climates and the abrupt demise of life forms. The centre plays a leading role in the studies of Mantle dynamics using 3-D computer simulations, geological and geophysical observations.

Awards 
Elected Member of the Norwegian Academy of Science and Letters

Selected publications
 Gaina, C., Blischke, A., Geissler, W.H., Kimbell, G.S. and O. Erlendsson, 2016, Seamounts and oceanic igneous features in the NE Atlantic: a link between plate motions and mantle dynamics, in The NE Atlantic Region: A Reappraisal of Crustal Structure, Tectonostratigraphy and Magmatic Evolution, eds. Peron-Pinvidic, G, Hopper, J. R., Stoker, M., Gaina, C., Doornebal, H., Funck, T., and U. Arting, Geol. Soc., London, Special Publications, 447. http://doi.org/10.1144/SP447.6
Shephard, G., R. Trønnes, W. Spakman, I. Panet, and C. Gaina, 2016, Evidence for a distinct slab under Greenland and links to North Atlantic and Arctic magmatism, Geophysical Research Letters, 43, doi:10.1002/2016GL068424 
Gaina, C., Nikishin, A.M., and, E.I. Petrov, 2015, Ultraslow spreading, ridge relocation and compressional events in the East Arctic region – A link to the Eurekan orogeny?, Arktos, doi:10.1007/s41063-015-0006-8. 
Gaina, C, D. van Hinsbergen, and W, Spakman, 2015, Reconstruction of the Arabia-India plate boundary since the Jurassic from marine geophysical, geological and seismic tomographic constraints, Tectonics, doi:0.1002/2014TC003780.
Gaina, C., S. Medvedev, T. H. Torsvik, I. Koulakov, and S. C. Werner, 2013, 4D Arctic: A Glimpse into the structure and evolution of the Arctic in the light of new geophysical maps, plate tectonics and tomographic models, 2013, Surveys in Geophysics, doi:10.1007/s10712-013-9254y. 

  Uses a moving hotspot frame after 100 Ma.

References

 Author list from Elements: An International Magazine of Mineralogy, Geochemistry, and Petrology

External links
 
 

Living people
Romanian geophysicists
Women geophysicists
Romanian women geologists
University of Bucharest alumni
University of Sydney alumni
Members of the Norwegian Academy of Science and Letters
Romanian expatriates in Norway
Year of birth missing (living people)
Tectonicists